Momperone is a comune (municipality) in the Province of Alessandria in the Italian region Piedmont, located about  east of Turin and about  southeast of Alessandria.

Momperone borders the following municipalities: Brignano-Frascata, Casasco, Cecima, Montemarzino, and Pozzol Groppo.

References

Cities and towns in Piedmont